|}

The Pendil Novices' Chase is a Grade 2 National Hunt steeplechase in Great Britain which is open to horses aged five years or older. It is run at Kempton Park over a distance of about 2 miles and 4½ furlongs (2 miles, 4 furlongs and 110 yards, or ), and during its running there are sixteen fences to be jumped. The race is for novice chasers, and it is scheduled to take place each year in late February.

The event is named after Pendil, a dual-winner of Kempton's King George VI Chase in the 1970s. It used to be named after an earlier "King George" winner, Galloway Braes. For a period the Galloway Braes Novices' Chase was contested over 2 miles, and it was extended to 2½ miles in 1990. It was renamed and increased to its present length in 1993.

Records
Leading jockey (6 wins):
 Ruby Walsh – Natal (2007), Oslot (2008), Herecomesthetruth (2009), The Nightingale (2010), Cristal Bonus (2012), Grandioso (2013)

Leading trainer (13 wins):
 Paul Nicholls – Napolitain (2006), Natal (2007), Oslot (2008), Herecomesthetruth (2009), The Nightingale (2010), Cristal Bonus (2012), Grandioso (2013), Irish Saint (2015), Frodon (2017), Cyrname (2018), Tamaroc Du Mathan (2021), Pic D'Orhy (2022), Solo (2023)

Winners

See also
 Horse racing in Great Britain
 List of British National Hunt races

References
 Racing Post:

 pedigreequery.com – Pendil Novices' Chase – Kempton.

National Hunt races in Great Britain
Kempton Park Racecourse
National Hunt chases